Högenbach is a river of Bavaria, Germany. It flows into the Pegnitz, near Pommelsbrunn.

See also
List of rivers of Bavaria

References

Rivers of Bavaria
Nürnberger Land
Rivers of Germany